Sye is a 2004 Indian Telugu-language sports action film directed by S. S. Rajamouli from a story by V. Vijayendra Prasad. The story has a rugby union backdrop. Nithin and Genelia D'Souza star while Shashank and Pradeep Rawat play other crucial roles. In the film, two rival groups in a college—Science led by Prudhvi and Arts led by Shashank—fight for superiority through the game of rugby, until a local gangster Bhikshu Yadav takes over their college. 

This was Rajamouli's third film after the successes of Student No.1 and Simhadri. It has music composed by M. M. Keeravani with cinematography and editing by K. K. Senthil Kumar and Kotagiri Venkateswara Rao respectively. The film earned ₹11 crore distributors' share (US$2.4 million) against a production budget of ₹10.2 crore (US$2.2 million) and was commercially successful. The film won four Nandi Awards. It was loosely remade into Bengali as Jor Jar Muluk Tar (2010).

Plot
Prudhvi (Nithiin) and Shashank (Shashank) are the leaders of two warring student groups in a Hyderabad college. They are fond of rugby union game, and they sort things out between them by playing rugby to prove superiority.

One day, a local mafia leader Bhikshu Yadav (Pradeep Rawat) gets a court notice that he has purchased the land of college from its legal heirs. Prudhvi and Sashank's groups unite by forgetting their differences to win back the land for the college. The students attack the political career of Bhikshu posting fake posters of him in the streets. They go to his liquor shops and play dead to make it appear that the shops sold false liquor which killed the students. After getting affected by assaults of students, Bhikshu Yadav throws a challenge to defeat his team in a game of rugby union to win back the land for their college. The rest of the story is how Prudhvi leads his team to the victory.

Cast

 Nithiin as Prudhvi
 Genelia D'Souza as Indu
 Shashank as Shashank
 Pradeep Rawat as Bhikshu Yadav
 Nassar as Qadar (College Property owner)
 Ajay as Bhikshu Yadav's henchman
 Rajiv Kanakala as Rugby coach Rafi
 Tanikella Bharani as Prudhvi's father and college principal
 Venu Madhav as Nalla Balu
 Supreeth as Bhikshu Yadav's henchmen
 Madhunandan as College Student
 Sameer as ACP Aravind
 Sivannarayana Naripeddi
 Narsing Yadav
 SS Kanchi as Indu's father
 Surya as Ping Pong
 Alapati Lakshmi
 Preeti Nigam as Prudhvi's mother
 Sekhar as Bhikshu Yadav's henchman
 Shravan as Shashank's classmate
 S.S.Rajamouli as Nalla Balu's henchman (cameo appearance)

 Natraj Master as Spare

Soundtrack
The film has six songs composed by M. M. Keeravani:

 "Appudappudu" - Lucky Ali & Sumangali - Lyrics: M. M. Keeravani
 "Chantaina Bujjaina" - Kalyani Malik, Smitha, & Vasundara Das - Lyrics: Chandrabose
 "Ganga A/C" - Kalyani Malik, Ganga, & Vasundara Das - Lyrics: Chandrabose
 "Gutlovundi" - Tippu & Malathi - Lyrics: Bhuvana Chandra
 "Nalla Nallani Kalla" - M. M. Keeravani & K. S. Chithra - Lyrics: Siva Shakti Datta
 "Pantham Pantham" - Devi Sri Prasad, M. M. Keeravani, Tippu, Chandrabose, Kalyani Malik, & Smitha - Lyrics: Chandrabose

Reception 
A critic from Sify opined that "Go ahead and enjoy and rugby game. Sye is a roller coaster ride of pure unadulterated masala".

Box office
The film had a successful 365-day run at one center. It collected ₹11 crore share at box office. Sye was the most expensive film in Rajamouli's career till 2004 as it was made with approximately ₹10 crore budget.

Recognition
In the lead up to the 2015 Rugby World Cup, a video of the rugby scenes from Sye went viral.

When Willie Hateraka, belonging to the Maori sect of New Zealand, working as the coach for Indian Army's Rugby team, saw the film Sye, was so impressed with the movie that he recommended Rajamouli's name to the International Rugby Board as the director for their proposed feature film based on Rugby. Hateraka, who couldn't even understand English properly nor the language of the film, connected to the film emotionally. The film went on to be one of the only 3 films that the Rugby Board found suitable as promotional material for the game of Rugby.

Awards
Nandi Awards
 Best Editor - Kotagiri Venkateswara Rao
 Best Male Dubbing Artist - P. Ravi Shankar
 Best Supporting Actor - Shashank
 Best Villain - Pradeep Rawat

Filmfare Awards South
 Filmfare Best Villain Award (Telugu) - Pradeep Rawat (2004)

Notes

References

External links 

2004 films
2000s Telugu-language films
Films scored by M. M. Keeravani
Indian action films
Indian sports films
Rugby union films
Rugby union in India
Films directed by S. S. Rajamouli
Films set in Hyderabad, India
Films shot in Hyderabad, India
2004 action films
2000s sports films
Sports action films
Telugu films remade in other languages